Natalino Fossati (born 23 June 1944) is a former Italian professional footballer and manager who played as a full-back.

In 2016, he was inducted into Torino F.C. Hall of Fame.

Career

Player
In his  youth, Fossati played for Alessandria and Torino.

In 1963, he was bought by Genoa, where he debuted in Serie A. After one season, he went back to Torino, where he spent most of his career, making a total of 329 appearances, scoring 19 goals, and contributing to the victory of two Coppa Italia. He is the eight player with most appearances in the club's history.

He then spent two seasons at Sampdoria in Serie A and two seasons at Biellese in Serie C, before ending his career at Alessandria in 1978.

Manager
Fossati has coached a number of Italian teams, including Sant'Angelo, Orbassano, Alessandria, Pro Vercelli, Pistoiese, Saviglianese, Rondinella, Pontedera, Derthona, Aosta, Avezzano, and Robbio.

Honours

Player
Torino
Coppa Italia: 1967–68, 1970–71

Individual 
Torino F.C. Hall of Fame: 2016

References

External links
 Natalino Fossati at CarriereCalciatori.it
 Natalino Fossati at Enciclopediadelcalcio.it
 

1944 births
Living people
Italian footballers
Association football defenders
Torino F.C. players
Genoa C.F.C. players
U.C. Sampdoria
A.S.D. La Biellese
A.C.D. Sant'Angelo 1907 managers
Italian football managers
U.S. Alessandria Calcio 1912 managers